Heaton is a habitational surname that originated in several locations in England. The name derives from Old English hēah ("high)" and tūn ("enclosure" or "settlement").

Notable people with the surname include:
 A. G. Heaton (1844–1930)
 Anne Heaton (disambiguation)
 Arthur B. Heaton (1875–1951), American architect
 Ben Heaton (born 1990), British rugby league footballer
 Bill Heaton (1918–1990), English footballer
 Bob Heaton (born 1956), American politician
 Charlie Heaton (born 1994), British actor and musician 
 Chris Heaton-Harris (born 1967), British politician, Member of the European Parliament
 Chuck Heaton (1917–2008), American sports news journalist
 Dave Heaton (born 1941), Iowa State Representative (1994–2018) 
 David Heaton (1823–1870), Congressional Representative from North Carolina
 Dennis Heaton, Canadian screenwriter
 Edward Heaton-Ellis (1868–1943), Vice-Admiral in the Royal Navy
 Eliza Putnam Heaton (1860-1919), American journalist, editor
 Ellen Heaton (1816–1894), British philanthropist and art collector
 Eric Heaton (1920–1996), English doctor of divinity
 Hannah Heaton (1721–1794), New England woman known for chronicling her experiences in the northern American royal colonies
 Harold R. Heaton (died 1940), American political cartoonist
 Henry Heaton (1846–1927), North-American amateur mathematician
 Jack Heaton (rugby union) (1912–1998), English rugby union footballer
 Jeff Heaton (born 1943), British rugby league footballer
 Joe L. Heaton (born 1951), United States federal judge
 John Heaton (disambiguation)
 Josh Heaton (born 1996), English footballer
 Kelly Heaton (born 1972), sculptor, perfumer, and owner of the Virginia Perfume Company
 Kenneth Willoughby Heaton (Aug 3, 1936-Mar 4, 2013), British/Indian surgeon who studied the effects of good on intestinal transit Times; développent of the Bristol Stool Form Scale
 Leonard D. Heaton (1902–1983), Surgeon General of the United States Army
 Marty Heaton (born 1959), former American football coach
 Mary Heaton (disambiguation), several people
 Matt Heaton (born 1993), Canadian rugby union player
 Michelle Heaton (born 1980), British pop star
 Mick Heaton (1947–1995), English footballer
 Mike Heaton (born 1966), British musician and member of the band Embrace
 Naomi Heaton, chief executive of UK real estate investment advisory London Central Portfolio Limited
 Neal Heaton (born 1960), Major League Baseball player
 Niykee Heaton (born 1994), American singer-songwriter
 Patricia Heaton (born 1958), American actress,  Everybody Loves Raymond
 Paul Heaton (born 1962), British musician and songwriter
 Peter Heaton-Jones (born 1963), British politician and journalist
 Richard Heaton, KCB British barrister and Permanent Secretary to the Ministry of Justice and Clerk of the Crown in Chancery
 Robert Heaton (1961–2004), English drummer (New Model Army)
 Robert Douglas Heaton (1873–1933), American politician
 Robert Heaton Rhodes (1815–1884), New Zealand politician
 Rodger Heaton, American attorney
 Ted Heaton (1872–1937), British diver notable for several unsuccessful attempts to swim the English Channel
 Thomas Heaton (disambiguation)
 Tim B. Heaton (born 1949), American educator and sociologist
 Timothy H. Heaton, Ph.D., American professor in archaeological geology
 Thomas Heaton (footballer, born 1897), English footballer
 Tom Heaton (born 1986), English footballer
 Tony Heaton (born 1954), British sculptor, disability rights activist and arts administrator
 William Heaton (born 1979), former chief of staff for Rep. Bob Ney (R-Ohio) and a supporting figure in the Abramoff scandal
 William Edward Heaton (1875–1941), English recipient of the Victoria Cross

See also
HeatoN, pseudonym of Emil Christensen (born 1984), Swedish Counter-Strike player
 Heaton (disambiguation)

References 

English-language surnames